José María Cantero (born 8 June 1959) is an Argentine professional golfer who played on the Challenge Tour, the European Tour and the Tour de las Americas.

Cantero turned professional in 1985. He played on the European Challenge Tour in 1990–1994 and he won three tournaments, all three of them taking place in Sweden, on this tour. In 1990, he finished 8th in the Challenge Tour Rankings.

In 1991, he placed 14th at the Lancia Martini Italian Open on the European Tour.

In 1994, he played three tournaments on United States second tier Nike Tour, later named the Korn Ferry Tour. His best finish was tied 12th at the 1994 NIKE Central Georgia Open.

Since the late 1990s, Cantero only played a few tournaments a year and only in South America. Since 2005, he has not been playing on any main golf tour.

Professional wins (13)

Challenge Tour wins (3)

Asia Golf Circuit wins (1)

Argentine Tour wins (7)
1987 Norpatagonico Open, Parana Open, Lobos City Tournament
1999 Jockey Club Rosario Open
2000 Jockey Club Rosario Open
2001 Norpatagonico Open
2002 La Rioja Open

Other wins (2)
1994 Prince of Wales Open (Chile)
1998 Nigerian Open

References

External links

Argentine male golfers
European Tour golfers
1959 births
Living people